Hadoa chiricahua is a species of annual cicada in the genus Hadoa. It is endemic  to the U.S. states of Arizona and New Mexico.

References

Hemiptera of North America
Insects described in 1923
Cryptotympanini